Kalle is a masculine given name of North Germanic origin, a variation of Karl. In Sweden, people named Karl are commonly nicknamed Kalle. The name is also found in Finland and Estonia   Notable people with the name include:

Given name

Kalle Anttila (1887–1975), Finnish freestyle and Greco-Roman wrestler and Olympic medalist
Kalle Bask (born 1982), Finnish sailor and Olympic competitor
Kalle Björklund (born 1953), Swedish footballer 
Kalle Brink (born 1975), Swedish professional golfer 
Kalle Coster (born 1982), Dutch sailor and Olympic medalist
Kalle Dalin (born 1975), Swedish orienteering competitor 
Kalle Eerola (born 1983), Finnish professional football midfielder 
Kalle Eller (born 1940), Estonian poet, publisher, neopagan and writer
Kalle Grünthal (born 1960), Estonian politician
Kalle Havulinna (born 1924), Finnish professional ice hockey player
Kalle Jalkanen (1907–1941), Finnish cross-country skier and Olympic medalist
Kalle Jents (born 1957), Estonian politician
Kalle Jürgenson (born 1960), Estonian astrophysicist and politician
Kalle Kaijomaa (born 1984), Finnish ice hockey defenceman 
Kalle Kainuvaara (1891–1943), Finnish diver and Olympic competitor
Kalle Kaljurand (born 1960), Estonian badminton player
Kalle Kankari (1889-1948), Finnish politician
Kalle Käsper (born 1952), Estonian author 
Kalle Katajisto (born 1991), Finnish motorcycle speedway rider
Kalle Kauppi (born 1992), Finnish footballer 
Kalle Keituri (born 1984), Finnish ski jumper and Olympic competitor
Kalle Kiik (born 1963), Estonian chess player and coach
Kalle Kiiskinen (born 1975), Finnish curler and Olympic competitor
Kalle Könkkölä (born 1950), Finnish politician
Kalle Kriit (born 1983), Estonian professional racing cyclist 
Kalle Kulbok (born 1956), Estonian politician
Kalle Kurg (born 1942), Estonian poet, writer, critic, translator and editor
Kalle Laanet (born 1965), Estonian politician
Kalle Lappalainen (1877–1965), Finnish sport shooter and Olympic medalist
Kalle Larsson (born 1969), Swedish politician
Kalle Lasn (born 1942), Estonian-born Canadian film maker, author, magazine editor and activist
Kalle Lassila (born 1985), Finnish cross country skier and Olympic competitor
Kalle Maalahti (born 1991), Finnish professional ice hockey player
Kalle Mäkinen (born 1989), Finnish footballer
Kalle Mattson (born 1990), Canadian musician
Kalle Mikkonen (born 1976), Finnish sprint canoer and Olympic competitor 
Kalle Moraeus (born 1963), Swedish musician
Kalle Muuli (born 1958), Estonian journalist, poet and politician
Kalle Multanen (born 1989), Finnish professional footballer
Kalle Nämdeman (1883–1945), Swedish songwriter, performer and recording artist
Kalle Olsson (born 1984), Swedish politician
Kalle Olsson (born 1985), Swedish professional ice hockey player 
Kalle Päätalo, (1919–2000), Finnish novelist 
Kalle Palander (born 1977), Finnish alpine skier
Kalle Palling (born 1985), Estonian politician
Kalle Parviainen (born 1982), Finnish football striker 
Kalle Randalu (born 1956), Estonian pianist
Kalle Rovanperä (born 2000), Finnish rally driver
Kalle Samuelsson (born 1986), Swedish Bandy player
Kalle Spjuth (born 1984), Swedish Bandy player 
Kalle Svensson (1925–2000), Swedish football goalkeeper
Kalle Tuppurainen (1904–1954), Finnish skier and Olympic competitor
Kalle Varonen (born 1974), Finnish freestyle swimmer
Kalle Vellevoog (born 1963), Estonian architect
Kalle Westerdahl (born 1966), Swedish film and television actor
Kalle Westerlund (1897–1972), Finnish wrestler and Olympic medalist

Fictional characters:
 Kalle, a fictional Finnish talk show host portrayed by Kristen Wiig on Saturday Night Live
Kalle Blomkvist, a fictional character created by Astrid Lindgren; see Bill Bergson

Surname
Maya Kalle-Bentzur (born 1958), Israeli Olympic runner and long jumper	
Wilhelm Ferdinand Kalle (1870-1954), German chemist, industrialist and politician

Stage name
 Le Grand Kallé, a Congolese musician 
 Pépé Kallé, a Congolese musician

See also

Calle (name)
Kale (name)
Kalla (name)
Kalli (name)
Kallu (name)

Swedish masculine given names
Finnish masculine given names
Estonian masculine given names

sv:Karl